The Colorado Springs Sun was a broadsheet-format newspaper published in Colorado Springs, Colorado, United States. The Sun was a daily newspaper that competed with The Gazette-Telegraph until 1986, when Aero bought it for $30 million, shut it down, retaining its trademark and naming rights. The sale included the Sun's archives and its name.

Defunct newspapers published in Colorado